Tristan Michael Alexander Abrahams (born 29 December 1998) is an English professional footballer who plays as a striker for EFL League Two club Gillingham, on loan from National League club Eastleigh.

He has previously played for Leyton Orient, Cambridge City, Norwich City, Exeter City, Yeovil Town, Newport County, Carlisle United and Grimsby Town.

Career

Leyton Orient
After signing his first professional contract in November 2016, Abrahams went on loan to Cambridge City, making his debut in the 0–0 draw against St Ives Town on 26 December, and returning to Orient in January 2017.

He made his Football League debut as a second-half substitute for Josh Koroma in Orient's 4–0 win at Newport County on 4 March 2017.

Abrahams scored his first senior goal in Orient's 2–2 draw at Luton Town at Kenilworth Road on 14 April 2017. He started the following game on 17 April and scored the winning goal as Orient beat Hartlepool United 2–1.

Norwich City
On 31 July 2017, Abrahams made the switch to Norwich City for an undisclosed fee.

Abrahams rejoined Orient on loan for the 2017–18 National League season. The loan spell was terminated on 1 September 2017 without any appearances made.

In July 2018, Abrahams joined League Two side Exeter City on loan until the end of the 2018–19 season.

On 31 January 2019, Abrahams was recalled from his loan at Exeter City and instead joined Yeovil Town on loan until the end of the season replacing his injured Norwich team-mate Diallang Jaiyesimi.

Newport County
On 25 July 2019, following his release from Norwich City, Abrahams signed for League Two side Newport County on a two-year contract. On 3 August 2019, he made his debut for Newport in a 2–2 draw against Mansfield Town as a second-half substitute He scored his first goal for Newport on 13 August 2019 in the EFL Cup first round win against Gillingham. On 12 November 2019 he scored a hat-trick for Newport in the 7–4 EFL Trophy win against Cheltenham Town. In July 2020 Abrahams was selected as Newport County's Young Player of the Year for the 2019–20 season. On 5 September 2020 Abrahams scored both goals in Newport's 2–0 EFL Cup First Round win against Championship club Swansea City. On 22 September 2020 Abrahams scored the first goal, a penalty, in Newport's 3–1 EFL Cup Second Round win against Championship club Watford. On 30 September 2020 Abrahams scored Newport's goal in the 1–1 EFL Cup Third Round match against  Premier League club Newcastle United, with Newcastle eventually winning on penalties. On 1 February 2021 Abrahams rejoined Leyton Orient on loan for the remainder of the 2020–21 season.

Carlisle United
In June 2021, at the end of his Newport contract, Abrahams joined Carlisle United on a two year deal.

On 20 January 2022, Abrahams signed for Grimsby Town on loan for the remainder of the 2021–22 season.

Abrahams came off the bench as Grimsby won promotion back to the Football League, with a 2-1 win in the 2022 National League play-off Final over Solihull Moors at the London Stadium.

Eastleigh
On 5 July 2022, Abrahams signed for Eastleigh on a free transfer.

On 31 January 2023, Abrahams joined EFL League Two club Gillingham on loan for the remainder of the season.

Career statistics

Honours
Grimsby Town
National League play-off winners: 2022
Individual

 Newport County Young Player of the Year: 2019–20

References

External links

Living people
1998 births
Association football forwards
Leyton Orient F.C. players
Cambridge City F.C. players
Norwich City F.C. players
Exeter City F.C. players
Yeovil Town F.C. players
Newport County A.F.C. players
Carlisle United F.C. players
Grimsby Town F.C. players
Eastleigh F.C. players
Gillingham F.C. players
English footballers
English Football League players
Southern Football League players
Footballers from Lewisham